Simone Consonni (born 12 September 1994) is an Italian professional racing cyclist, who currently rides for UCI WorldTeam . He rode at the 2015 UCI Track Cycling World Championships. In August 2018, he was named in the startlist for the Vuelta a España. In May 2019, he was named in the startlist for the 2019 Giro d'Italia. In August 2020, he was named in the startlist for the 2020 Tour de France. He won the gold medal in the team pursuit at the 2020 Summer Olympics held at Tokyo in 2021, setting a new world record.

His younger sister Chiara Consonni is also a professional cyclist.

Career achievements

Major results

Road

2011
 National Junior Championships
3rd Road race
3rd Time trial
 8th Overall Tre Ciclistica Internazionale Bresciana
2012
 4th Trophée de la Ville de Loano
2014
 2nd Gran Premio della Liberazione
 5th La Popolarissima
2015
 1st La Côte Picarde
 2nd  Road race, UCI World Under-23 Championships
 2nd Gran Premio della Liberazione
 4th La Popolarissima
 4th Trofeo Città di San Vendemiano
 6th Circuito del Porto
 6th Giro del Belvedere
 7th Gran Premio della Costa Etruschi
 9th Trofeo Alcide Degasperi
2016
 1st  Road race, National Under-23 Championships
 1st Trofeo Città di San Vendemiano
 1st Gran Premio Industria e Commercio Artigianato Carnaghese
 3rd Circuito del Porto
 5th Gran Premio Bruno Beghelli
2017
 1st Young rider classification, Three Days of De Panne
 5th Grand Prix de Fourmies
 6th Coppa Bernocchi
 9th Bretagne Classic
 9th Gran Premio Bruno Beghelli
2018
 Tour of Slovenia
1st  Points classification
1st Stage 1
 5th London–Surrey Classic
2019
 2nd Coppa Bernocchi
 2nd Ronde van Limburg
 4th Memorial Marco Pantani
 8th Bredene Koksijde Classic
2021
 4th Giro del Veneto
 5th La Roue Tourangelle
 8th Overall Tour Poitou-Charentes en Nouvelle-Aquitaine
1st  Points classification
2022
 1st Paris–Chauny
 2nd Ronde van Limburg
 4th Paris–Tours
 6th Clásica de Almería
 7th Classic Brugge–De Panne
 7th Primus Classic
 8th Eschborn–Frankfurt
 9th Milano–Torino
2023
 7th Overall Saudi Tour
1st Stage 5

Grand Tour general classification results timeline

Track

2013
 1st  Omnium, National Championships
2015
 2nd  Elimination race, UEC European Championships
2016
 1st  Omnium, National Championships
 2nd  Team pursuit, UEC European Championships
2017
 1st Team pursuit, UCI World Cup, Pruszków
 2nd  Team pursuit, UEC European Championships
 3rd  Team pursuit, UCI World Championships
2018
 UCI World Championships
3rd  Omnium
3rd  Team pursuit
2019
 1st Six Days of London (with Elia Viviani)
2020
 UCI World Championships
2nd  Scratch race
3rd  Team pursuit
2021
 1st  Team pursuit, Olympic Games
 UCI World Championships
1st  Team pursuit
2nd  Madison (with Michele Scartezzini)
2023
 UEC European Championships
1st  Points race
1st  Team pursuit
2nd  Madison (with Elia Viviani)
2nd  Omnium

World records

References

External links
 
 
 
 
 
 

1994 births
Living people
Italian male cyclists
Cyclists from the Province of Bergamo
Olympic cyclists of Italy
Olympic gold medalists for Italy
Olympic medalists in cycling
Cyclists at the 2016 Summer Olympics
Cyclists at the 2020 Summer Olympics
Italian track cyclists
Medalists at the 2020 Summer Olympics
People from Ponte San Pietro
UCI Track Cycling World Champions (men)
21st-century Italian people